Mount Geikie is a mountain in the West Coast Range of Western Tasmania, Australia.

Location and features
Mount Geikie sits just north of Lake Margaret, and is just west of the smaller tributary lakes of Lake Margaret – Lake Mary, Lake Martha, and Lake Magdala. The east face of Mount Geikie area has two named features that lie to the north and south. The Chin at  lies to the south, and is the point where the West Coast Range dips to the glacial features known as the Hamilton moraine.

The surrounding high ground to the north of Mount Geikie is often known as 'The Tyndalls' or confused with Mount Tyndall. The area is at the northern end of a block of mountains that are north of Mount Sedgwick which sits above the first large glacial valley between Mount Sedgwick and Mount Lyell. The 'Tyndalls' have a number of glacial lakes, and lies south east of the Henty Gold-Mine, and Hydro Tasmania dam on the Henty River – and south of Lake Mackintosh,  Lake Murchison and Tullah.

See also

 List of highest mountains of Tasmania

References

Bibliography

External links 
 West Coast Range on Google Maps
 https://web.archive.org/web/20070907132410/http://www.parks.tas.gov.au/wha/wherein/detail.html – context of World Heritage Area

Geikie, Mount
Geikie, Mount